Peter Heger (born 3 June 1942) is a South African cricketer. He played in 21 first-class and 2 List A matches for Border from 1963/64 to 1971/72.

See also
 List of Border representative cricketers

References

External links
 

1942 births
Living people
South African cricketers
Border cricketers
Cricketers from East London, Eastern Cape